SAM Colombia Flight 501 was a Boeing 727-46 that crashed on 19 May 1993, killing all 132 on board. The aircraft collided with a mountain while on approach to Medellín, Colombia.

Aircraft 
The aircraft involved was a Boeing 727-46, registered as HK-2422X (factory no. 18876, serial no. 217), which was built in 1965 and had its maiden flight on December 30 of that year. The aircraft was powered by three Pratt & Whitney JT8D-7A turbofan engines. The aircraft was delivered to Japan Airlines on January 7, 1966, and was registered as JA8309. On November 16, 1972, the airliner was leased to Korean Air, where it was re-registered as HL7309. On November 9, 1980, Korean Air sold the aircraft to SAM Colombia, where it was re-registered as HK-2422X.

Accident 
At 14:18, Flight 501 took off from Panama City, Panama, bound for Bogotá, Colombia, with a stopover in Medellín. The aircraft climbed to flight level 160 (about ). On board were 7 crew members and 125 passengers, including several Panamanian dentists on their way to a convention.

Thunderstorm activity in the area made automatic direction finder (ADF) navigation more difficult, and the Medellín VOR/DME was unusable, having been attacked by terrorists. The crew reported over the Abejorral NDB beacon at FL160, as they were approaching Medellín. The flight was then cleared to descend to FL120 (about ), after which communication was lost. After multiple failed attempts to contact the flight, Medellín ATC declared an emergency.

Because the radio beacon was unserviceable, the crew made navigational errors. The 727 had actually not yet reached the beacon, and descended into mountainous terrain. The flight then struck the  Mount Paramo Frontino.

References

External links

Airliner accidents and incidents involving controlled flight into terrain
Accidents and incidents involving the Boeing 727
Airliner accidents and incidents caused by pilot error
Aviation accidents and incidents caused by air traffic controller error
Aviation accidents and incidents in 1993
Aviation accidents and incidents in Colombia
SAM Colombia accidents and incidents
1993 in Colombia
May 1993 events in South America